Aleksandar Vlaški (born 21 April 1982) is a Serbian former professional tennis player.

Born and raised in Belgrade, Vlaški was a three-time All-American tennis player for the Washington Huskies (University of Washington). In 2003 he made the NCAA semi-finals and won the ITA All-American Singles Championship, to become the first Husky since 1924 to claim a national title. During his career he amassed the most all-time wins for the Huskies and in 2004 reached number two in the Division 1 rankings.

Vlaški, a left-handed player, competed on the professional tour after graduating from college, reaching career high rankings of 299 in singles and 160 in doubles. He won two ATP Challenger doubles titles.

Challenger titles

Doubles: (2)

References

External links
 
 

1982 births
Living people
Serbian male tennis players
Serbia and Montenegro male tennis players
Washington Huskies men's tennis players
Tennis players from Belgrade